Tabernaemontana lagenaria is a species of plant in the family Apocynaceae. It is found in French Guinea, northern Brazil, and Peru.

References

lagenaria